A variety of treaties and agreements have been enacted to regulate the use, development and possession of various types of weapons of mass destruction (WMD). Treaties may regulate weapons use under the customs of war (Hague Conventions, Geneva Protocol), ban specific types of weapons (Chemical Weapons Convention, Biological Weapons Convention), limit weapons research (Partial Test Ban Treaty, Comprehensive Nuclear-Test-Ban Treaty), limit allowable weapons stockpiles and delivery systems (START I, SORT) or regulate civilian use of weapon precursors (Chemical Weapons Convention, Biological Weapons Convention). The history of weapons control has also included treaties to limit effective defense against weapons of mass destruction in order to preserve the deterrent doctrine of mutual assured destruction (Anti-Ballistic Missile Treaty) as well as treaties to limit the spread of nuclear technologies geographically (African Nuclear Weapons Free Zone Treaty, Nuclear Non-Proliferation Treaty).

There is a separate list of states parties to several of the major weapons of mass destruction treaties.

General 
* Year of entry into force in parentheses
Protocol I (1977) and Protocol II (1977) of the Geneva Conventions (1949)
Environmental Modification Convention (1978) (list of states parties)

Delivery systems
International Code of Conduct against Ballistic Missile Proliferation (2002, not a treaty)

Biological weapons

Chemical weapons

Nuclear weapons

Disarmament and non-proliferation

Regional restrictions

Weapons limitation

Cooperation

See also
 Arms control
List of parties to weapons of mass destruction treaties
 Nuclear arms race
 Nuclear-free zone
 Nuclear proliferation
 Nuclear weapon
 Nuclear warfare
 Nuclear-weapon-free zone
 International Atomic Energy Agency
 Organisation for the Prohibition of Chemical Weapons
 General Purpose Criterion

References 

WMD
Treaties
Treaties
Treaties
Treaties
Wmd